The Howland H-2 Honey Bee is an American homebuilt aircraft that was designed by Bert Howland and made available by Howland Aero Design in the form of plans for amateur construction, with kits provided by Aircraft Spruce & Specialty Co. The H-2 first flew in 1986.

Design and development
The H-2 is a single-seat, open cockpit biplane, with conventional landing gear and a single engine in tractor configuration.

The aircraft is made from aluminium and covered in doped aircraft fabric covering. The fuselage is made from square aluminum tubing that is TIG welded and weighs  when completed. Its  span wings are of a straight planform and both of equal span. The wings have seven foam wing ribs per wing panel and incorporate a D-cell front spar and a C-channel rear spar. The landing gear is conventional, with suspended main wheels and a steerable tailwheel. The H-2 has an open cockpit, with a small windshield. Controls are conventional three-axis, with ailerons, rudder and elevator. The standard design has two ailerons, with four optional.

Since the death of the designer plans have been intermittently available and were last provided by Classic Aero Enterprises. Aircraft Spruce and Specialty continue to provide raw materials kits.

Installation of the  Hirth F30, or an equivalent engine, along with an inverted fuel system, allows intermediate level competition aerobatics.

The plans consist of 40 engineering drawings and a booklet of construction notes. Estimated building time is 800 hours.

Variants
H-2
Base model with two ailerons and a  Hirth 2706 engine
H-2A
Aerobatic competition model with four ailerons, inverted fuel system and a  Hirth F30 engine

Specifications (H-2)

See also

References

External links
Photo of an H-2 in flight

1980s United States ultralight aircraft
Homebuilt aircraft
Single-engined tractor aircraft